Anolis pygmaeus, the Chiapas pygmy anole, is a species of lizard in the family Dactyloidae. The species is found in Mexico.

References

Anoles
Reptiles described in 1956
Endemic reptiles of Mexico
Taxa named by Hobart Muir Smith